Nadia Petrova was the defending champion, but lost in the final to Maria Sharapova 5–7, 2–6.

This was the final singles career of former World No. 3 Mary Pierce, who had retired in the second set where she was leading 6–5, due to sustaining a knee injury.

Seeds
The top four seeds received a bye into the second round.

Draw

Finals

Top half

Bottom half

References
 Main and Qualifying Draws (WTA)

Generali Ladies Linz - Singles